Viktor Fyodorovich Yerin (17 January 1944, Kazan, Russian SFSR – 19 March 2018) was a Russian politician and General of the Army who served as the country's first post-Soviet Minister of Internal Affairs (1992—1995). Hero of the Russian Federation (1993).

Biography 
Viktor Yerin began his career in Soviet security forces (police). Working in Tatarstan police, he participated in investigating especially dangerous criminal bands. Since 1991 Yerin served as the first deputy minister of interior of the RSFSR. In January 1992, he became Russia's interior minister. In November 1992, he led an operative staff for re-establishing constitutional order in the Ossetian-Ingush conflict region. From December 1994 to January 1995 he was in charge of the activities of the Russian interior ministry troops in Chechnya. On 30 June 1995, after the failed operation to free hostages taken by Chechen terrorists in Budyonnovsk, Yerin had to resign (as did the then-FSB director Stepashin). On 5 July 1995, Yerin was assigned the position of deputy director of Russia's Foreign Intelligence Service. 

In 1993, Viktor Yerin was awarded the title Hero of the Russian Federation for his part in quelling the anti-Yeltsin rebellion in October 1993.

Awards 
Order of the Red Star
Jubilee Medal "In Commemoration of the 100th Anniversary since the Birth of Vladimir Il'ich Lenin"
Medal "For Labour Valour"
Medal "Veteran of Labour"
Medal Defender of a Free Russia

References 

1944 births
2018 deaths
Interior ministers of Russia
Heroes of the Russian Federation
Politicians from Kazan
20th-century Russian politicians
Military personnel from Kazan